V Laltanpuia (born 20 September 1985) is an Indian professional footballer who plays as a midfielder for Aizawl in the I-League on loan from Mizoram Police.

Career
Born in Mizoram, Laltanpuia has played for United Sikkim in the I-League 2nd Division before joining Aizawl for their second division campaign. After helping Aizawl gain promotion to the I-League he left the club to join Mizoram Police of the Mizoram Premier League. He captained the side in the league. While playing for Mizoram Police, Laltanpuia represented his state of Mizoram in the Santosh Trophy in 2012, 2013, 2014, and 2016. He was part of the Mizoram squad to win their first ever Santosh Trophy when they defeated Railways in the final 3–0.

Aizawl (loan)
On 31 December 2016, before the 2016–17 I-League season, it was announced that Laltanpuia would be loaned back to his old club, Aizawl, for the campaign. He made his debut back for the club on 4 February 2017 against Mohun Bagan. He started the match and played 79 minutes as Aizawl were defeated 3–2.

Career statistics

References

1985 births
Living people
Indian footballers
Aizawl FC players
Association football midfielders
Footballers from Mizoram
I-League 2nd Division players
Mizoram Premier League players
I-League players